Łukasz Kubot and Marcelo Melo were the defending champions, but Kubot chose not to participate. Melo played alongside Ivan Dodig, but lost in the first round to Feliciano López and Stefanos Tsitsipas.

Juan Sebastián Cabal and Robert Farah won the title, defeating Rajeev Ram and Joe Salisbury in the final, 6–4, 6–2.

Seeds

Draw

Draw

Qualifying

Seeds

Qualifiers
  Alexander Erler /  Lucas Miedler

Lucky losers
  Sander Gillé /  Dominik Koepfer

Qualifying draw

References

External links
 Main draw

Erste Bank Open - Doubles
2021 Doubles
2021 in Austrian tennis